The University of Minnesota College of Continuing and Professional Studies (CCAPS) is a professional school of the University of Minnesota based at its Saint Paul Campus.  The school offers applied graduate and undergraduate degrees, professional development certificates, practical-knowledge conferences and individualized degrees.

The College changed its name from the College of Continuing Education (CCE) in October, 2017 "to better reflect our mission, which is to provide opportunities for people to enhance their academic credentials, to advance their careers through professional courses, and to continue to learn across their lifespan through enrichment activities".

The General Extension Division (as it was originally named) was founded in 1913 University President George Edgar Vincent, to provide ongoing education to adult learners. Over the years since then it has had various names including the College of Continuing Education and Extension, and University College. Throughout the years, the mission has remained the same: to provide for the educational needs of the people of Minnesota.

References

External links
University of Minnesota College of Continuing and Professional Studies main page
About the University of Minnesota College of Continuing and Professional Studies
Radio K

1913 establishments in Minnesota
Educational institutions established in 1913
Universities and colleges in Minneapolis